Bryan J. Edwards (born November 13, 1998) is an American football wide receiver who is currently a free agent. He played college football at South Carolina and was drafted by the Las Vegas Raiders in the third round of the 2020 NFL Draft.

Early years
Edwards attended Conway High School in Conway, South Carolina. During his career, he had 188 receptions for 2,562 yards and 32 touchdowns. He was selected to play in the 2016 U.S. Army All-American Game, but did not play due to injury. He committed to the University of South Carolina to play college football.

College career

Edwards started all 12 games he played in his freshman year at South Carolina in 2016. He had 44 receptions for 590 yards and four touchdowns. As a true freshman, Edwards earned Athlon's Freshman All-America second-team honors and All-SEC Freshman first-team accolades. As a sophomore in 2017, he started all 13 games and led the team with 64 receptions for 793 yards and five touchdowns. As a junior in 2018, he had 55 receptions for 846 yards and seven touchdowns. During his senior year in 2019, he passed Kenny McKinley's school record for career receptions and Alshon Jeffery's school record career receiving yards. He played in the first 10 games of the season before suffering a season-ending injury. He finished the season with 71 receptions for 816 yards and six touchdowns. For his career, he had 234 receptions, 3,045 receiving yards and 22 touchdowns.

South Carolina football receiving records:
 1st place all-time receptions: 234 receptions
 1st place all-time receiving yards: 3,045 yards
 2nd place all-time receiving touchdowns: 22 receiving touchdowns
 1st place all-time consecutive games with a reception: 48 consecutive games with a catch

Professional career

Las Vegas Raiders 
Edwards was drafted by the Las Vegas Raiders in the third round with the 81st overall pick of the 2020 NFL Draft. The Raiders obtained this pick along with two first round picks as part of the trade that sent defensive end Khalil Mack to the Chicago Bears.

Edwards entered his first training camp competing for a starting job against Tyrell Williams, Nelson Agholor, Hunter Renfrow, Zay Jones, and fellow rookie Henry Ruggs III. At the end of the Raiders’ training camp, head coach Jon Gruden named Edwards and Ruggs as the starting wide receivers for the 2020 NFL season.

Edwards made his first career start and NFL debut in the Raiders’ season-opening win against the Carolina Panthers, notching 1 reception for 9 yards on one target. The following week against the New Orleans Saints, Edwards recorded 2 receptions for 42 yards on two targets in the 34-24 win. In the Raiders’ Week 3 contest against the New England Patriots, Edwards recorded 2 receptions for 48 yards on 3 targets before leaving the game with an ankle injury. He missed Weeks 4-8 recovering from the injury. After returning from the injury in Week 9, Edwards lost his starting job to Nelson Agholor and took on a depth role for the remainder of the season. In the Raiders’ season finale against the Denver Broncos, Edwards recorded 2 receptions for 51 yards and his first career touchdown catch during the 32–31 win. Edwards finished his rookie season appearing in 12 games (3 starts) and recording 11 receptions for 193 yards and a touchdown.

Atlanta Falcons 
On May 13, 2022, the Raiders traded Edwards along with a 2023 seventh-round pick to the Atlanta Falcons for a 2023 fifth-round selection. On November 24, 2022, Edwards was released by the Falcons.

Kansas City Chiefs 
On November 28, 2022, the Kansas City Chiefs signed Edwards to their practice squad. He was released on January 4, 2023.

NFL career statistics

References

External links
Las Vegas Raiders bio
South Carolina Gamecocks bio

1998 births
Living people
People from Conway, South Carolina
Players of American football from South Carolina
American football wide receivers
South Carolina Gamecocks football players
Las Vegas Raiders players
Atlanta Falcons players
Kansas City Chiefs players